Loza Abera Geinore (Amharic:ሎዛ አበራ) is an Ethiopian professional footballer who currently plays for Nigd Bank of the Ethiopian Women's Premier League and the Ethiopia women's national team as a forward.

Early life 
She was the third child of her family and the only female player in her neighborhood, she used to play football with mainly male composed teams both in school football matches and  neighborhood football matches in her town Durame, Loza started playing football at the age of six. In 2011, she participated in the All Ethiopian games representing the SNNP regional state, a tournament in which she scored seven goals and that become her initial momentum to get noticed by Ethiopian Woman National Team recruiters.

Club career

Ethiopia
Abera joined her first professional club, Hawassa City S.C. Women, in 2012. Spending two years at the club, she helped the club to two 3rd-place finishes in the league while being the team's top goal scorer for both seasons.

After an invitation from then coach Asrat Abate, Abera joined Dedebit F.C. Women (now defunct). She spent four years at Dedebit F.C., winning the League and top goal scorer honors in all four years. She finished the 2015–16 EWPL season with 47 goals during season and 10 goals in the playoff competition.

Despite lucrative offers from various teams, she made a promise to herself to finish high school. She did, and went on to Addis-Abeba University school of commerce while signing contracts from the area.

Abera signed with Adama City Women midway through the 2018–19 EWPL season after her brief stint in Sweden with Kungsbaka DFF. Continuing her success in her home country, she helped Adama City win its first ever EWPL title.

After six seasons playing in the EWPL, Abera has scored over 200 goals and holds the record for most goals in the league's history. In November 2020, she signed for Nigd Bank of the Ethiopian Women's Premier League.

Abroad 
Abera has had trials with Antalyaspor (Turkey) and Kungsbaka DFF (Sweden). During her stay in Kungsbaka, she helped the team win a regional title and gain promotion to the top tier. However, her stay with the club ended after the season due to financial reasons.

In September 2019, she signed for Birkirkara F.C. (women) Women of the Malta Women's Premier League. She finished her first season as the Maltese league's top goal scorer with 30 goals in 12 appearances.

Awards
Abera was included on the list of the BBC's list of 100 Women announced on 23 November 2020.

References

ሎዛ አበራ

Living people
Women's association football forwards
Ethiopian women's footballers
Adama City F.C. players
1997 births
BBC 100 Women